Kwanza (The First) is an album by drummer Albert Heath featuring performances recorded in 1973 and originally released on the Muse label.

Reception
Andrew Gilbert of KQED says, "Kwanza captures a mid-career master with a long-established reputation as one of the most eloquent and adaptable drummers in jazz ... Heath wasn’t content to organize an all-star jam session. He’d been collaborating and studying composition with multi-instrumental explorer Yusef Lateef, and he used Kwanza to investigate some of the chamber music concepts he’d been working on". Jazz Views' Eddie Myer observed, "This album come replete with all kinds of modish innovations, from Swahili titles to 4/4 straight-8 rock rhythms, to guitar and rhodes from the youngest members".

Track listing
All compositions by Albert Heath, except Oops! by Percy Heath.
 "Tafadhali" – 6:56
 "A Notion" – 5:29
 "Dr. JEH" – 6:22
 "Dunia" – 4:01
 "Oops!" – 6:33
 "Sub-Set" – 10:11

Personnel
Albert Heath – drums, chimes, timpani
Curtis Fuller – trombone 
Jimmy Heath – tenor saxophone, soprano saxophone, flute
Kenny Barron – piano, electric piano
Ted Dunbar – guitar
Percy Heath  – bass

References

Muse Records albums
Albert Heath albums
1973 albums
Albums produced by Don Schlitten